Hornepayne railway station is located in the township of Hornepayne, Ontario, Canada. This station is served by Via Rail's transcontinental train The Canadian.

The station was established in 1913 by the Canadian Northern Railway as a divisional point and headquarters for the Superior Division, under the name Fitzbach railway station; its name was changed to Hornepayne around 1920. Until the arrival of the highway in the 1980s, the town was dependent on the railway for transportation of supplies into the community. It was demolished in 2020 by its owner CN, citing safety concerns.

References

External links

 Hornepayne railway station

Via Rail stations in Ontario
Railway stations in Algoma District
Railway stations in Canada opened in 1913
Designated heritage railway stations in Ontario
1913 establishments in Ontario
Canadian Northern Railway stations in Ontario
Demolished buildings and structures in Ontario